Kenneth Frank Cole (born 15 October 1943) is an Australian former professional basketball coach and player who is the team president for the Adelaide 36ers of the National Basketball League (NBL). As a player, he competed in the men's tournament at the 1964 Summer Olympics with the Australia national basketball team. In 2012, Cole was selected to become a member of the Australian Basketball Hall of Fame.

References

External links
 

1943 births
Living people
Adelaide 36ers coaches
Australian men's basketball players
1970 FIBA World Championship players
Basketball players at the 1964 Summer Olympics
Basketball players from Sydney
National Basketball League (Australia) coaches
Olympic basketball players of Australia